This is a list of sportspeople with nicknames.

Aviation sport

 "Mungo" = Mike Mangold, 
 "The Quick Corsican" = Nicolas Ivanoff, 
 "Witt" = Steve Wittman,

Baseball

Basketball

 "Ack-Ack" = Tom Heinsohn, American forward-center
 "Action Jackson" = Mark Jackson, American point guard
 "The Admiral" = David Robinson, American center
 "A.I." = Allen Iverson, American shooting guard
 "Air Jordan" = Michael Jordan, American shooting guard
 "The Answer" = Allen Iverson, American shooting guard
 "The A-Train" = Artis Gilmore, American center
 "Big Aristotle" = Shaquille O'Neal, American center
 "Big Ben" = Ben Wallace, American center-forward
 "Big Country" = Bryant Reeves, American center
 "The Big Dipper" = Wilt Chamberlain, American center
 "Big Dog" = Glenn Robinson, American power forward
 "The Big E" = Elvin Hayes, American power forward
 "Big Nasty" = Corliss Williamson, American power forward
 "Big O" = Oscar Robertson, American point guard (and precursor to the modern point forward)
 "Big Red" = Dave Cowens, American center
 "The Big Ticket" = Kevin Garnett, United States power forward
 "Bimbo" = Vernell Coles, United States basketball player
 "Bird" = George Yardley, United States basketball player
 "Black Mamba" = Kobe Bryant, United States shooting guard
 "Blue" = Theo Edwards, United States shooting guard
 "Bo" = Charles Outlaw, United States power forward
 "Buck" = Charles Williams, United States power forward
 "Buddha" = James Edwards, United States center
 "Buddy" = Harry Jeannette, United States basketball player
 "Butterbean" = Bob Love, United States power forward
 "Cadillac" = Greg Anderson, United States basketball player
 "Cat" = Cuttino Mobley, United States basketball player
 "Chief" = Robert Parish, American center
 "Chocolate Thunder" = Darryl Dawkins, American center
 "The Chuckster" = Charles Barkley, American power forward
 "Clyde" = Walt Frazier, United States point guard
 "Clyde The Glide" = Clyde Drexler, United States shooting guard
 "Cornbread" = Cedric Maxwell, United States basketball power forward
 "DJ" = Dennis Johnson, American combo guard
 "D Square" = Dale Davis, United States center
 "Dee" = DeCovan Kadell Brown, United States basketball player
 "Diesel" = Shaquille O'Neal, American center
 "Doc" = Glenn Rivers, American point guard
 "Dr. Dunkenstein" = Darrell Griffith, American shooting guard
 "Dr. J" = Julius Erving, American small forward
 "Dr. Rounds" = Dan Roundfield, United States power forward
 "Dollar Bill" = Bill Bradley, American small forward
 "Doug E. Fresh" = Gerald Wilkins, United States shooting guard
 "The Dream" = Hakeem Olajuwon, Nigerian-American center
 "Dugie" = Slater Martin, United States basketball player
 "Earl The Pearl" = Earl Monroe, United States shooting guard
 "The enormous Mormon" = Shawn Bradley, United States center
 "Fast Eddie" = Edward Johnson Jr., United States basketball player
 "Fat" = Lafayette Lever, United States point guard
 "The Glove" = Gary Payton, American point guard
 "The Goat" = Earl Manigault, United States basketball player
 "Googs" = Tom Gugliotta, United States power forward
 "Grandma-ma" = Larry Johnson, United States power forward
 "Greyhound" = Walter Davis, United States shooting guard
 "Hap" or "Happy" = Harold Hairston, United States basketball player
 "The Hawk" = Connie Hawkins, United States power forward
 "The High Ayatolla of Slamola" = Larry Nance, United States power forward
 "His Heinous" = Bill Laimbeer, United States center
 "Hondo" = John Havlicek, American small forward
 "Horse" = Dan Issel, American forward-center
 "Hot Rod" =
 Rodney Hundley, American swingman
 John Williams, American power forward
 "The Houdini of the Hardwood" = Bob Cousy, American point guard
 "The Hoya Destroya" = Patrick Ewing, Jamaica-born American center
 "The Human Highlight Reel" = Dominique Wilkins, American combo forward
 "Iceman" = George Gervin, American shooting guard
 "Iso Joe" = Joe Johnson, American shooting guard
 "Jellybean" = Joe Bryant, United States power forward and WNBA coach
 "Junior" = Ulysses Bridgeman, American small forward
 "The Junk Yard Dog" = Jerome Williams, United States power forward
 "Kangaroo Kid" = Billy Cunningham, United States basketball player
 "Li'l Abner" = Cliff Hagan, American forward-center
 "The Logo" = Jerry West, United States shooting guard
 "Mad Max" = Vernon Maxwell, United States shooting guard
 "Magic" = Earvin Johnson, American point guard
 "The Mailman" = Karl Malone, United States power forward
 "Mão Santa" (Portuguese for "Holy Hand") = Oscar Schmidt, Brazilian small forward
 "Microwave" = Vinnie Johnson, American shooting guard
 "Mighty Mouse" = Damon Stoudamire, American point guard
 "Mr. Big Shot" = Chauncey Billups, American guard
 "Mr. Bill" = Bill Cartwright, American center
 "Mr. Clutch" = Jerry West, United States shooting guard
 "Mr. Everything" = Craig Ehlo, American small forward
 "Mr. Mean" = Larry Smith, United States basketball player
 "Mr. Moves" = Michael Russell, United States basketball player
 "Moochie" = Martyn Norris, United States point guard
 "Mookie" = Daron Blaylock, United States point guard
 "Muggsy" = Tyrone Bogues, American point guard
 "Nate The Great" = Nate Thurmond, United States center
 "Never Nervous" = Pervis Ellison, United States center
 "Nick The Quick" = Nick Van Exel, American point guard
 "The Owl Without a Vowel" = Bill Mlkvy, United States basketball player
 "Peja" = Predrag Stojaković, Serbian small forward
 "Penny" = Anfernee Hardaway, United States basketball player
 "Pistol Pete" = Pete Maravich, United States shooting guard
 "Pitchin' Paul" = Paul Arizin, United States basketball player
 "Pooh" = Jerome Richardson, United States basketball player
 "Popeye" = Ronald Jones, United States power forward
 "The Reign Man" = Shawn Kemp, United States power forward
 "Red" = Johnny Kerr, United States basketball player
 "Red" = Ephraim J. Rocha, United States basketball player
 "Rifleman" = Chuck Person, American small forward
 "Rip" = Richard Hamilton, United States shooting guard
 "Rooney" = Šarūnas Marčiulionis, Lithuanian shooting guard
 "The Round Mound of Rebound" = Charles Barkley, American power forward
 "Shaq" = Shaquille O'Neal, United States center
 "Sheed" = Rasheed Wallace, United States power forward
 "Silk" = Jamaal Wilkes, American small forward
 "Sir Charles" = Charles Barkley, United States power forward
 "Sleepy" = Eric Floyd, United States shooting guard
 "Smush" = William Parker, United States basketball player
 "Speedy" = Craig Claxton, United States point guard
 "Spider" =
 John Salley, United States power forward
 Jerry Sloan, United States shooting guard
 "Spud" = Anthony Webb, American point guard
 "The Squid" = Sidney Moncrief, American shooting guard
 "Starbury" = Stephon Marbury, United States basketball player
 "Stormin' Norman" = Norm Van Lier, American point guard
 "Stumpy" = Gail Goodrich, United States basketball player
 "Sweetwater" = Nathaniel Clifton, United States basketball player
 "T-Mac" = Tracy McGrady, American swingman
 "Thunder Dan" = Dan Majerle, United States shooting guard
 "Tiny" = Nate Archibald, American point guard
 "Tractor" = Robert Traylor, United States power forward
 "Tree" = Wayne Rollins, United States center
 "The Truth" = Paul Pierce, United States basketball player
 "Turbo" = Deni Avdija, Israeli Small forward
 "U.D." = Udonis Haslem, American power forward
 "The Waiter" = Toni Kukoč, Croatian small forward
 "Wilt the Stilt" = Wilt Chamberlain, United States center
 "The Wizard(s)" =
 Gus Williams, United States basketball player
 Walt Williams, United States basketball player
 "The Worm" = Dennis Rodman, United States power forward
 "The X-Man" = Xavier McDaniel, American power forward
 "Zeke" = Isiah Thomas, United States point guard
 "Zeke from Cabin Creek" = Jerry West, United States shooting guard

Biathlon

 "The Cannibal" = Ole Einar Bjørndalen 
 "The Flying Frenchman" = Raphaël Poirée 
 "The King of Biathlon" = Ole Einar Bjørndalen 
 "Lucky Luke" = Simon Eder 
 "Rotkäppchen" (German: "Little Red Riding Hood") = Kati Wilhelm 
 "Super-Svendsen" = Emil Hegle Svendsen 
 "Turbo-Disl" = Uschi Disl 
 "Willi the Kid" = Wilfried Pallhuber 

Boxing

 "The Greatest" = Muhammad Ali 
 "The Ballet Dancer" = Salamo Arouch 
 "Baby Jake" = Jacob Matlala 
 "Big Bad John" = John McDermott 
 "Big George" = George Foreman 
 "The Boxing Doctor" = Harold Reitman 
 "The Bronx Beauty" = Al Singer 
 "The Bionic Hand" = Gerrie Coetzee 
 "Chrysanthemum Joe" = Joe Choynski 
 "Dangerous" = Dana Rosenblatt 
 "Fraudley" = Audley Harrison  (intended to be an insult by Frank Warren)
 "Iron" = Mike Tyson 
 "The Ghetto Midget" = Isadore "Corporal Izzy" Schwartz 
 "The Ghetto Wizard" = Benny Leonard 
 "Ghost of the Ghetto" = Sid Terris 
 "The Human Hairpin" = Harry Harris 
 "The Knob Hill Terror" = Monte Attell 
 "The Lion from Zion" = Roman Greenberg 
 "Little Fish"  =  Benny Bass 
 "The Little Hebrew" = Abe Attell 
 "Marvelous" = Marvin Hagler 
 "The Newsboy" = Abraham Jacob Hollandersky 
 "Old Chocolate" = George Godfrey 
 "La Petite Terreur" = Alphonse Halimi 
 "Ruby the Jewel of the Ghetto" = Ruby Goldstein 
 "Slapsie" = Maxie Rosenbloom 
 "Star of David" = Dmitry Salita "The Baddest Man on the Planet" = Mike Tyson 
 "The Turk" = Carolina Duer 
 "Wild Man" = Pavlo Ishchenko 

Bullfighting

 "José Falcón" = José Carlos Frita Falcao 
 "El Niño del Sol Naciente" = Atsuhiro Shimoyama 

Cricket

 "Fab Four" = Rahul Dravid, Sachin Tendulkar, Sourav Ganguly, and V. V. S. Laxman; 
 "The Fearsome Foursome" = Michael Holding,  Malcolm Marshall, Andy Roberts, Joel Garner; 
 "The Wall" = Rahul Dravid,
 "The Cat" = Phil Tufnell, 
 "Creepy" = John Crawley, 
 "Wireless" = Joe Root, 
 "Chef", "Captain Cook" = Alistair Cook, 
 "Beefy" = Ian Botham, 
 "Banger" = Marcus Trescothick, 
 "Pup" = Michael Clarke, 
 "Smudge" = Steve Smith, 
 "Baz" = Brendon McCullum, 
 "The Big Show" = Glenn Maxwell, 
 "White Lightning" = Allan Donald, 
 "Steyn Gun" = Dale Steyn, 
 "Alfie" = Justin Langer, 
 "Haydos" = Matthew Hayden, 
 "All Hands Zondeki" = Monde Zondeki, 
 "Fizz", "Cutter master" = Mustafizur Rahman, 
 "Narail Express" = Mashrafe Mortaza, 
 "Rawalpindi Express" = Shoaib Akhtar, 
 "Little Master", "God of Cricket" = Sachin Tendulkar, 
 "Dada" = Sourav Ganguly, 
 "Boom Boom Afridi", "Lala" = Shahid Afridi, 
 "Gabbar" = Shikhar Dhawan, 
 "Mr.360 Degree" = AB de Villiers, 
 "Cheeku", "King Kohli" = Virat Kohli, 
 "Bhajji" = Harbhajan Singh, 
 "Captain Cool" = Mahendra Singh Dhoni, 
 "Hitman" = Rohit Sharma, 
 "Slinga" = Lasith Malinga, 
 "Dial M" = Tim Murtagh, Ireland 

Cycling

 "The Animal" = Ellen van Dijk,  road racing and track cycling rider
 "Afro-Bob" = Robert de Wilde,  BMX racing rider
 "Amtrak" = Charles Townsend,  BMX racing rider
 "Big Chuck" = Charles Townsend,  BMX racing rider
 "Black Magic" = Charles Townsend,  BMX racing rider (which he had stenciled on the back of his racing pants in 1985)
 "Breakaway killer" = Ji Cheng,  road cyclist
 "Bubba" = Burlin Harris III,  BMX racing rider
 "The Cannibal" = Eddy Merckx,  road racing
 "Chasemainian Devil" = Charles Townsend,  BMX racing rider
 "Choo-Choo Charlie" = Charles Townsend,  BMX racing rider
 "Crazy Eric" = Eric Steele,  freestyle BMX rider
 "Dirt" = Brian Foster,  BMX racing rider
 "The Earthquake" = Eric Carter,  BMX and downhill racing rider
 "Farmer John" = John Tomac,  BMX, Cross-country and road racing rider
 "The Fleein' Korean" = Charles Townsend,  BMX racing rider
 "The Flying Dutchman" = Robert de Wilde,  BMX racing rider
 "The Golden Child" = Eric Carter,  BMX and downhill racing riderGo December 1989 Vol.1 No.2 pg.17
 "The Green Hornet" = David Zabriskie,  road racing rider
 "Jack" = John Prince,  cyclist (and board track racing pioneer)
 "Jake the Snake" = Jacob Heilbron,  Cyclo-cross rider
 "Johnny T" = John Tomac,  BMX, Cross-country and road racing rider
 "King of Skateparks" = Eddie Fiola,  freestyle BMX rider
 "Leopard Head" = Sam Pilgrim,  Freerider
 "Mellow Johnny" = Lance Armstrong,  road racing rider (from Maillot Jaune, French for Yellow jersey)
 "No Way Rey" = Hans Rey,  bike trials rider
 "The Real McHoy" = Chris Hoy,  track cycling
 "Scrawny" = Donald Robinson,  BMX racing
 "Sheffield Steel" = Steve Peat,  downhill racing rider
 "The Snake" = Mike King,  BMX racing
 "Speeding Locomotive Charlie" = Charles Townsend,  BMX racing
 "Steam Engine Charlie" = Charles Townsend,  BMX racing
 "Stumpdog" = Randy Stumpfhauser,  BMX racing
 "Stumpy" = Randy Stumpfhauser,  BMX racing
 "T.I." = Takashi Ito,  freestyle BMX
 "Tomac Attack" = John Tomac,  BMX racing, Cross-country and road racing
 "The Tome" = John Tomac,  BMX, Cross-country and road racing rider
 "Torchy" = William Peden,  racing cyclist

Darts

 "Wolfie" = Martin Adams 
 "The Flying Scotsman" = Gary Anderson 
 "The Machine" = James Wade 
 "Barney" = Raymond van Barneveld 
 "The Crafty Cockney" = Eric Bristow 
 "The Viking" = Andy Fordham 
 "Mighty Mike" = Michael van Gerwen 
 "Jackpot" = Adrian Lewis 
 "Old Stone Face" = John Lowe 
 "Darth Maple" = John Part 
 "The Power" = Phil Taylor 
 "Snakebite" = Peter Wright 

Football
Association football

"Ace" = Patrick Ntsoelengoe 
"Baby-Faced Assassin" = Ole Gunnar Solskjaer 
"The black Tulip" = Ruud Gullit 
"Daemon" = Erling Haaland 
"El Pibe de Oro" ("The Golden Boy") = Diego Maradona 
"Hulk" = Givanildo Vieira De Souza 
"Kaká" =
 Ricardo Izecson dos Santos Leite 
 Claudiano Bezerra da Silva 
 David Leonel Faleiro 
 Ferreira Guimarães 
 Carlos Eduardo Ferreira Batista 
"La Pulga" (The Flea) = Lionel Messi 
"Mad Dog" = Magnus Østby-Deglum 
 "Pelé" = Edson Arantes do Nascimento  
"Trigger" = Jason McAteer 
"R8" = Ronaldo Luís Nazário de Lima 
"Shoe" = John Moshoeu  
"Slow Poison" = Lesley Manyathela 
"The Wardrobe" = Papa Bouba Diop 
"White Knight" = Matthew Booth 

American football

 "Breesus" = Drew Brees "The Cowboy" = Justin Smith "Dirty Dozen" = 1975 Dallas Cowboys team "Gunslinger" = Brett Favre "The Hogs" = 1980s/1990s Washington Redskins offensive line
 "Megatron" = Calvin Johnson "Refrigerator" = William Perry
 "Shady" = LeSean McCoyGreenstein, Teddy. "Pitt's 'Shady' McCoy shines in South Bend spotlight" Retrieved on December 23, 2013

Canadian football
All players are Canadian unless indicated otherwise.

 "Indian Jack" = Jack Jacobs, American quarterback and punter of Creek heritage
 "The Little Assassin" = Ron Lancaster, American quarterback, coach, and executive
 "The Little General" = Ron Lancaster, American quarterback, coach, and executive

Golf

 "Big Three" =
 Gary Player 
 Arnold Palmer 
 Jack Nicklaus 
 "Big Phil" = Phil Mickelson 
 "Magnificent Seven" =
 Nancy Lopez 
 Pat Bradley 
 Amy Alcott 
 Patty Sheehan 
 Betsy King 
 Beth Daniel 
 Juli Inkster 
 "Mrs. Doubtfire" = Colin Montgomerie 
  = Ryo Ishikawa 
 "The Small Unit" = Chez Reavie 
 "The Goose" = Retief Goosen 
 "The Black Knight" = Gary Player 

Horse racing
Jockeys/Trainers

 "Bo-rail" = Calvin Borel  flat (from his penchant for steering his mounts close to the rail)
 "C-Team" = Felix Coetzee  flat and Tony Cruz, trainer and former jockey  (with Cheng Keung-fai, owner)
 "The Long Fellow" = Lester Piggott  flat

Hockey
Field hockey

 "" (The Magician) = Luciana Aymar  
 "Saini Sisters" = four sisters from Punjab  
 "The Wizard" =   Dhyan Chand   

Ice hockey

 "(The) Rocket" = Maurice Richard, Canadian ice hockey player
 "747" = Marc Crawford, Canadian ice hockey player
 "Ace" = Garnet Bailey, Canadian ice hockey player
 "AK-27" = Alexei Kovalev, Russian winger
 "Alexander the Great" =
 Alexander Mogilny, Russian winger
 Alexander Ovechkin, Russian winger
 "The A-Train" = Anton Volchenkov, Russian ice hockey player
 "Big Bird" = Larry Robinson, Canadian defenceman
 "Kovy" =
 Ilya Kovalchuk, Russian winger
 Alexei Kovalev, Russian winger
 "Sammy" = Sergei Samsonov, Russian winger

Martial arts
Judo

 "Rusty" = Rena Kanokogi 

Karate

 "Master Ishii" = Kazuyoshi Ishii 

Mixed martial arts

 "The Bear" = Mark Smith 

Rugby
Union

 "Billy Whizz" = Jason Robinson, fullback and wing 
 "Robbo" = Jason Robinson, fullback and wing 
 "The Fun Bus" = Jason Leonard, Prop 
 "Shaggy" = Will Greenwood, Centre 
 "Pitbull" = Brian Moore, Hooker 
 "Pine Tree" = Colin Meads, Lock 
 "The Beaver" = Stephen Donald, Fly Half / Centre 
 "The Judge" = Paul Rendall, Prop 
 "Squeaky" = Rob Andrew, Fly Half 
 "Alfie" = Gareth Thomas, Centre/Wing 
 "The Iron Duke" = Bobby Windsor, Hooker 
 "Uncle Fester" = Keith Wood, Hooker 
 "Judith" = Craig Chalmers, Fly Half 
 "The Great White Shark" or "JJ" = John Jeffrey, Flanker 
 "Nobody" = John Eales, 2nd Row 
 "The Chiropractor" = Brian Lima, Centre 
 "Ox" = Ox Nché, Prop 
 "" (Afrikaans nickname, which means Ox) = Os du Randt, Prop 
 "Kwagga" = Kwagga Smith,  flanker 
 "The Enforcer"  = Bakkies Botha, lock 
 "The Beast" = Tendai Mtawarira, Prop 
 "" (The Caveman) = Sébastien Chabal,   number eight 
 "Pocket Rocket" = Brent Russell, Utility players 
 "Pocket Dynamo" = Gio Aplon, Fullback / Wing 
 "" (Afrikaans for potato chips or french fries) = Pieter Rossouw, Wing 
 "The Viking" = Erik Lund Lock 

League

 "Chariots" = Martin Offiah,  British international 

Skateboarding

 "Bam" = Brandon Margera 
 "Bucky" = Charles Lasek 
 "Little Fairy" = Rayssa Leal 
 "P-Rod" = Paul Rodriguez Jr. 

Snooker

Tennis

Track and field

 "Emperor" = Haile Gebrselassie, long distances 
 "The fastest man on no legs" = Oscar Pistorius, paralympic sprinter 
 "Little Emperor" = Haile Gebrselassie, long distances 
 "Oz" = Oscar Pistorius, paralympic sprinter 
 "Lightning Bolt" = Usain Bolt, Olympic sprinter 
"Pocket Rocket" = Shelly-Ann Fraser-Pryce, Olympic sprinter 
 "Stella the Fella" = Stella Walsh, sprinter 
 "Wonder Boy" = So Wa Wai, paralympic sprinter 

Triathlon

 "The Chrissinator" = Chrissie Wellington 
 "Muppet" = Chrissie Wellington 

 "The Grip" = Mark Allen 
 "The Man" = Dave Scott 

Volleyball

 "Iron Hammer" = "Jenny" Lang Ping  indoor
 "Six Feet of Sunshine" = Kerri Walsh  beach

Watersport
Diving
 "The Princess of Diving" = Guo Jingjing, 

Sailing

 "Bertie" = Stanley Reed, 
 "Tahiti Bill" = Bill Howell, 

Surfing

 "The Black Night" = Mickey Dora, 
 "Da Cat" = Mickey Dora, 
 "Eppo" = Michael Eppelstun, 
 "The father of surfing" = Duke Kahanamoku, 
 "Mickey" = Miklos Dora, 
 "Midget"" = Bernard Farrelly, 
 "Miki" = Mickey Dora, 
 "Mr. Malibu" = Mickey Dora, 
 "Mr. Pipeline" =
 Butch Van Artsdalen, 
 Gerry Lopez, 
 "The Wounded Seagull" = Mark Richards, 

Swimming

 "The Albatross" = Michael Groß, 
 "The Baltimore Bullet" =Michael Phelps, 
 "The Lochtenator" =Ryan Lochte, 
 "Lucy" = Liu Zige,  (given by her coach Ken Wood as he cannot pronounce her name properly)

Other
 "Cliff" = Griff Sanders,  lawn bowler (alternative name, used by friends)
 "DeG" = Patrick de Gayardon,  skydiver and wingsuit flying pioneer
 "Iron Lady" = Wendy Chai,  ten-pin bowler
 "Magic" = Joel Johnson,  radio-controlled car racer
  = Masami Hirosaka,  radio-controlled car racer
 "Miss Ping" = Leah Neuberger,  table tennis player
 "Re-Pete" = Pete Fusco Jr.,  radio-controlled car racer
 "Super Dan" = Lin Dan,  badminton player
 "Tim" = Joseph Boggan,  table tennis player
 "White Warrior(s)" = Fung Ying Ki, Yu Chui Yee, Fan Pui Shan, Kwong Wai Ip, Chan Kam Loi, Hui Charn Hung, Yan Yun Tai and Chan Wing Kin, Chan Yui Chong, Wong Kit Mui''';  wheelchair fencers
 "German "(given by Koji Kato of NHK) =
 Johannes Rydzek
 Fabian Rießle
 Eric Frenzel

See also

 Nickname
 Lists of nicknames – nickname list articles on Wikipedia

References

Further reading
 Sports nicknames: 20,000 professionals worldwide
 From A-Train to Yogi: The Fan's Book of Sports Nicknames
 From Abba-Dabba to Zorro: The World of Baseball Nicknames
 The Great Book of Penn State Sports Lists
 Sports roots: how nicknames, namesakes, trophies, competitions, and expressions in the world of sports came to be

Lists of people with nickname by occupation
Nickname
List